Balian Buschbaum (born 14 July 1980 in Ulm) is a former German pole vaulter.

Life and career
Buschbaum competed in women's pole vaulting before his gender transition, winning the title of German Youth Champion multiple times. In 1999 Buschbaum became the German pole vault champion, later that year setting the German record for pole vault with a height of 4.42 m, beating his previous junior world record of 4.37 m. His personal best is 4.70 metres, achieved in June 2003 in Ulm. On 21 November 2007 Buschbaum announced his retirement from the sport due to a persistent injury and the desire to begin gender reassignment. In January 2008, Buschbaum announced that his new first name was "Balian", after the blacksmith in the movie Kingdom of Heaven, and that he would undergo gender affirming surgery later that year.

Buschbaum worked until the end of the indoor 2012–2013 season as a high jump coach in Mainz.

Achievements
All placements are for women's events and prior to his gender transition.

Works 

 Blaue Augen bleiben blau. Mein Leben. (Blue Eyes Stay Blue. My Life) Krüger, Frankfurt 2010, .
 Frauen wollen reden, Männer Sex: wie verschieden sind wir wirklich, Herr Buschbaum? (Women Want to Talk, Men Want Sex: How Different are we Really, Mr. Buschbaum?) Fischer Taschenbuch, Frankfurt 2013, .

See also
 Germany all-time top lists - Pole vault

References

External links
Official website (in German)

1980 births
Athletes (track and field) at the 2000 Summer Olympics
European Athletics Championships medalists
German male pole vaulters
German LGBT sportspeople
LGBT track and field athletes
Living people
Olympic athletes of Germany
Transgender men
Transgender sportsmen
21st-century German LGBT people
Sportspeople from Ulm